Homewood School and Sixth Form Centre is an academy school in Tenterden, Kent, England. Homewood is a non-selective school, but is situated within the Kent selective system. It has been awarded specialist Arts College status.  It provides education for students from the town itself and surrounding villages. It is the largest secondary school in Kent and one of the 10 largest secondary schools in the United Kingdom as of the end of 2020. The school is current rated 'Requires Improvement' by Ofsted.

References

External links
School website
Sinden Theatre website

Academies in Kent
Secondary schools in Kent
Tenterden